Vice Admiral Satish Soni is a retired Indian Navy officer. He is a former Commandant of the National Defence Academy (NDA) and Commander-in-Chief of Southern Command and Eastern Command.

Education
Soni is an alumnus of the NDA and a specialist in Navigation and Aircraft Direction, the Flag Officer is an alumnus of the Defence Services Staff College, Wellington and College of Naval Warfare, Mumbai.

Career
Soni was commissioned into the Indian Navy on 1 July 1976. The Flag Officer's sea commands include the ocean going Pondicherry-class minesweeper INS Kakinada(M 70), the guided missile corvette , the guided-missile frigate  and the guided missile destroyer Delhi. He has had the honour of having commissioned two warships, Kakinada and Talwar, in Russia, as the Commanding Officer. His staff appointments include deputy director of Personnel, Joint Director of Naval Plans and Naval Assistant to Chief of the Naval Staff at Integrated Headquarters-Ministry of Defence (Navy).

On his elevation to Flag rank, assumed responsibilities as the Assistant Chief of Personnel (Human Resource Development) at Integrated Headquarters-Ministry of Defence (Navy). Subsequently, the Flag Officer commanded the Eastern Fleet of the Indian Navy, and thereafter took over as Chief of Staff, Eastern Naval Command. Vice Admiral Satish then followeded it by being appointed as Commandant, National Defence Academy at Khadakvasla, Pune from 22 November 2009 to 31 December 2010. He served as Flag Officer Commanding in Chief, Southern Naval Command from 2012 to 2014. In his previous assignment, the Vice Admiral served as Deputy Chief of the Naval Staff at Integrated Headquarters Ministry of Defence (Navy) at New Delhi.

He served as Commander in Chief Eastern Command before his retirement in 2016.

Soni is a keen sportsman and represented the Indian Navy in squash and golf in his younger days.

Awards and decorations

References

Living people
Indian Navy admirals
Deputy Chiefs of Naval Staff (India)
Flag Officers Commanding Eastern Fleet
Commandants of the National Defence Academy
Recipients of the Param Vishisht Seva Medal
Recipients of the Ati Vishisht Seva Medal
Year of birth missing (living people)
Recipients of the Nau Sena Medal
Defence Services Staff College alumni